Velugu Needalu is a 1961 Telugu-language film produced by D. Madhusudhana Rao under the Annapurna Pictures banner and directed by Adurthi Subba Rao. It stars Akkineni Nageswara Rao and Savitri, with music composed by Pendyala Nageswara Rao.

The film was simultaneously filmed in Tamil as Thooya Ullam.

Plot 
Rao Bahadur Venkataramaiah (S. V. Ranga Rao) owns a printing press and a magazine. Vengalappa (Relangi) works for him. Venkataramaiah and his wife Kanaka Durgamma (Suryakantham) adopt a girl Suguna (Baby Sasikala / Savitri). After she gives birth to a child Varalakshmi (Girija), Kanaka Durgamma's affection towards Suguna diminishes and she throws her out. Vengalappa and his wife Santhamma (T. G. Kamala Devi) raise her. Suguna joins M.B.B.S. Chandra Shekar (Akkineni Nageswara Rao), nephew of Vengalappa, who is also a student of the same college and they fall in love. Suguna gives tuition to Subhadramma's (Sandhya) son. Subhadramma's brother Dr. Raghunath (Jaggaiah) returns from London. Chandram is a chain-smoker, afflicted with tuberculosis. Heeding Chandram's words, Suguna marries Raghu. Chandram is admitted to the Union Mission Sanatorium in Madanapalle and is cured. Raghu meets with a fatal accident on his way to receive Chandram. Bowing to Suguna's wish, Chandram marries Varalakshmi and steers the press and the magazine towards profit. Kanaka Durgamma sows suspicion in Varalakshmi about Suguna and Chandram's relationship. Chandram joins the workers in their fight for the bonus. Venkataramaiah brings in new workers. While trying to stop the fight between them, Varalakshmi is grievously injured. Suguna saves her. The shadows are a thing of the past in their family.

Cast 
The Telugu cast list is adapted from the book Thiraikalanjiyam Part2

Telugu
Akkineni Nageshwara Rao as Chandram
Savitri as Suguna
S. V. Ranga Rao as Rao Bahadur Venkataramaiah
Jaggayya as Dr. Raghunath
Relangi as Vengalappa
Padmanabham as Medical Student
Peketi Sivaram as Sivaram
Suryakantham as Kanaka Durgamma
Girija as Varalakshmi
Rajasulochana as Special appearance in song Padavoyi Bharateeyuda
E. V. Saroja as Special appearance in song Sariganchu Cheerakatti
Sandhya as Subhadramma
T. G. Kamala Devi as Santhamma
Surabhi Kamalabai
Mohana as Nurse
Nagarjuna Akkineni as infant Raghu

Telugu
Male cast
Akkineni Nageshwara Rao
S. V. Ranga Rao
K. A. Thangavelu
K. Balaji
Natarajan
Nagarathinam
Mani
Dharmaraj

Tamil
Female cast
Savitri
E. V. Saroja
M. S. Sundari Bai
Sandhya
Surabhi Kamalabai
T. G. Kamaladevi
Baby Sasikala
Mohana
Rajeswari

Production 
Velugu Needalu was simultaneously filmed in Tamil as Thooya Ullam, with K. A. Thangavelu replacing Relangi. Thooya Ullam is the first film that was screened in Shanti Theatre, Chennai. While C. V. Sridhar wrote the dialogues for the film, K. S. Gopalakrishnan who later became a popular director, taught the cast to render the dialogues.

Soundtrack 
Music composed by Pendyala Nageswara Rao.

Tamil
Udumalai Narayana Kavi and Kannadasan wrote the lyrics.

References

External links 
 

1960s multilingual films
1961 drama films
1961 films
Films directed by Adurthi Subba Rao
Films scored by Pendyala Nageswara Rao
Indian black-and-white films
Indian drama films
Indian multilingual films
1960s Tamil-language films
1960s Telugu-language films